Romford Rural District was a local government district in southwest Essex, England from 1894 to 1934. It surrounded, but did not include, Romford which formed a separate urban district. During the life of the district the area changed in use from rural farm land to sprawling London suburb and in 1926 much of it was removed to form new urban districts.

Precursors
The setting up of rural local government districts had its origins in the union of parishes following the Poor Law Amendment Act 1834. Romford Poor Law Union was created in 1836. It consisted of the parishes of Barking, Cranham, Dagenham, Great Warley, Havering atte Bower, Hornchurch, Rainham, Romford, Upminster and Wennington. In 1837 an identical area became Romford Registration District for the purposes of the Births and Deaths Registration Act 1836. The Poor Law union area was used again for the purposes of the Public Health Act 1875 and Romford Rural Sanitary District was created in 1875. For the purposes of the rural sanitary district (but not the Poor Law union or registration district) areas that formed local boards were removed from the area. This occurred for Barking Town (1882), Ilford (1890) and Romford (1851).

Creation
It was created a rural district in 1894 by the Local Government Act 1894, based on the Romford rural sanitary district. Before 1894 the part of Romford parish corresponding to the town was covered a local board of health. Under the 1894 legislation the parish was split with the former board of health district becoming the Romford Urban parish the remainder formed the Romford Rural parish. The former also constituted the Romford Urban District and the latter was a component parish within the larger rural district. The arrangement did not last, and in 1900 the two parishes were abolished and their former area used to create a Romford parish which constituted the enlarged Romford Urban District.

In 1911 the rural district had a combined area of 29,720 acres (120 km2) and consisted of the following parishes:

Dagenham and Hornchurch
In 1925 Dagenham and Hornchurch parish councils applied for conversion to urban districts. Dagenham included much of the vast Becontree estate and had experienced a rapid rise in population. Hornchurch was undergoing a lot of suburban house building. The Romford Rural District Council objected to both applications. The Hornchurch Ratepayers' Association opposed Hornchurch gaining urban powers. In 1926 the parish of Hornchurch was removed to form Hornchurch Urban District and the parish of Dagenham  was removed to form Dagenham Urban District.

Abolition
In 1934 the district was abolished and the remaining parishes transferred to neighbouring districts:

The area today forms parts of the London Borough of Havering and the London Borough of Barking and Dagenham in Greater London. A boundary change in 1993 transferred the remaining parts of Great Warley to the Brentwood Borough of Essex.

References

History of the London Borough of Havering
History of the London Borough of Barking and Dagenham
Districts of England created by the Local Government Act 1894
History of local government in London (1889–1965)
Rural districts of England